Gornje Laze is a small settlement in the Municipality of Semič in southeastern Slovenia. The municipality is included in the Southeast Slovenia Statistical Region. The area is part of the historical region of Lower Carniola.

References

External links
Gornje Laze at Geopedia

Populated places in the Municipality of Semič